is a former Japanese football player. He played for Japan national team.

Club career
Ito was born in Mie Prefecture on July 1, 1959. After graduating from high school, he joined the Japan Soccer League Division 2 club Honda in 1978. In 1980, the club won the championship and was promoted to Division 1. In 1985-86, the club won third place and he left the club at the end of the season. He joined PJM Futures in 1988. He retired in 1993.

National team career
On June 19, 1981, Ito debuted for Japan national team against Malaysia.

National team statistics

References

External links
 
 Japan National Football Team Database

1959 births
Living people
Association football people from Mie Prefecture
Japanese footballers
Japan international footballers
Japan Soccer League players
Japan Football League (1992–1998) players
Honda FC players
Sagan Tosu players
Association football midfielders